Morinaga is a Japanese surname. Notable people with the surname include:

Ai Morinaga, Japanese manga artist
, Japanese voice actress
Masaki Morinaga, Japanese long jumper
, Japanese singer
Milk Morinaga, Japanese manga artist
Sōkō Morinaga, Rinzai Zen roshi
, Japanese footballer

See also
Prince Morinaga, murdered by Ashikaga Tadayoshi during the Kemmu Restoration
Morinaga & Company, a Japanese confectionery company
Morinaga Milk Industry, a Japanese milk products company

Japanese-language surnames